"It's Only Over for You" is a song written by Mike Reid and Rory Bourke, and recorded by American country music artist Tammy Wynette for her 1985 album Sometimes When We Touch. In 1986, the song was recorded by Michael Johnson for his album Wings and Tanya Tucker for her album Girls Like Me. Tucker's version was released in March 1987 as the fourth single from Girls Like Me. It reached number eight on the Billboard Hot Country Singles & Tracks chart.

Chart performance

References

External links
 

1987 singles
1985 songs
Tammy Wynette songs
Tanya Tucker songs
Michael Johnson (singer) songs
Songs written by Rory Bourke
Songs written by Mike Reid (singer)
Capitol Records Nashville singles
Song recordings produced by Jerry Crutchfield